Herbert Melville Harriman (September 28, 1873 – January 3, 1933) was an American heir, businessman and sportsman.

Early life
Harriman was born on September 28, 1873, in New York City. His father, Oliver Harriman, was a dry goods merchant. His mother was Laura Low.

Harriman graduated from Princeton University. He served in the American Expeditionary Forces of the United States Army during World War I.

Career
Harriman started his career as a clerk in Omaha, Nebraska for Union Pacific Railroad. Even though his family were majority shareholders, Harriman wanted to start at the bottom and work his way up. However, he quit after a few months and moved back to New York.

Harriman became a socialite on the East Coast. He was stockholder of the Newport Casino. Additionally, he was a member of the Newport Reading Room, He was also a member of the Meadow Brook Golf Club, The Brook, the Turf and Field Club and the Piping Rock Club.

Personal life
Harriman married three times. He married his first wife, Isabella Hunnewell, of a prominent Boston family, on September 26, 1894, at the Hunnewell home in Wellesley, Massachusetts. His second wife was Mary Madeline “May” Brady. They married in August 1908 at Newport, Rhode Island, and divorced in 1921. His third and final wife was Sarah Jane Hunter. They married on October 26, 1921, in Paoli, Indiana.

Harriman was an avid golf and tennis player. In golf, he won both the U.S. Amateur and the Metropolitan Amateur in 1899.

Death
Harriman died on January 3, 1933, in Aghadowey, County Londonderry, Northern Ireland. His estate was inherited by his widow.

Notes

References

Businesspeople from New York (state)
American male golfers
Amateur golfers
Princeton University alumni
United States Army personnel of World War I
Businesspeople from New York City
Harriman family
1873 births
1933 deaths